Ciro (Cyrus) is an opera in three acts and a prologue by the Italian composer Francesco Cavalli in collaboration with Andrea Mattioli. It was first performed at the Teatro San Giovanni e San Paolo, Venice on January 30, 1654.  The libretto is by Giulio Cesare Sorrentino in a revised version by Aurelio Aureli. Sorrentino's libretto had been set the previous year by Francesco Provenzale for the royal theatre in Naples.

References

Source
Brenac, Jean-Claude, Le magazine de l'opéra baroque online at perso.orange.fr  Retrieved 9 September 2011

Operas
Operas by Francesco Cavalli
1654 operas
Operas set in Iran
Italian-language operas